Orquesta Mondragón is a Spanish pop rock band from San Sebastián (Basque Country), very popular in the 1980s, led by Javier Gurruchaga. The group was founded in 1976 and continues today.

Discography
Muñeca hinchable (1979)
Bon voyage (1980)
Bésame, tonta (soundtrack, 1982)
Cumpleaños feliz (1983)
¡Es la guerra! (1984)
Rock & Roll Circus (live, 1985)
Ellos las prefieren gordas (1987)
Una sonrisa, por favor (1989)
El huevo de Colón (1992)
Memorias de una vaca (live, 1995)
Tómatelo con calma (2000)
El maquinista de la general (2010)
Liverpool Suite (2013)
Anda suelto Satanás (2016)

References

Discography on Discogs

Spanish musical groups
Comedy rock musical groups
Musical groups established in 1976